The Mighty Nach Live is the third audio release of Scottish band Albannach. It was intermittently live-recorded in 2007 while the band traveled throughout Scotland and North America.

Track listing

Credits

 Jamesie Johnston - Bass Drum, Vocals, Bodhrán
 Donnie MacNeill - Bagpipes, Drums
 Jacquie Holland - Drums, Percussion, Vocals
 Kyle Gray - Lead Drum
 Aya Thorne - Bodhrán, Percussion
 Davey 'Ramone' Morrison - Bodhrán, Vocals, Whistles
 Andy Malkin - Engineering, Additional instruments
 Mick MacNeil - Production

External links
 Albannach Band Website www.albannachmusic.com
 Sample Tracks on ShoutCAST

2008 live albums
Albannach (band) albums